Lake Huntington is a hamlet (and census-designated place) in the Town of Cochecton in Sullivan County, New York, United States. Lake Huntington has a post office with ZIP code 12752, which opened on February 2, 1893.

References

Hamlets in Sullivan County, New York
Hamlets in New York (state)